The number of fraternities and sororities at the University of Minnesota is extensive. Approximately 11% of undergraduates, 3,400 students, participate in one of the 60 chapters of social fraternities or sororities at the University of Minnesota, Twin Cities campus. Participation in affiliated groups associated with the Greek System such as honor, service, and professional fraternities bring total Greek System affiliation figures significantly higher.  Counting past and present, more than half of the university's 200 Greek organizations remain active today, the pioneers of which have had a presence on the University of Minnesota campus for over 145 years. The university's "Greek System" includes professional fraternities, honor societies, service fraternities, and religious fraternities along with the highly visible residential undergrad academic and social chapters.

A comprehensive list of chapters, past and present, segmented by category, follows this brief overview of what these societies are and how they evolved. References for each group show current and former property addresses either owned or leased. Contact information is provided via the references, where available.

The terms "Fraternity" and "Sorority" are used somewhat interchangeably, with men's and co-ed groups always using Fraternity, and women's groups using either Fraternity or Sorority. For convenience, the term "Greek Letter Society" is a generic substitute. The word, "Greek," in this case refers to the use of Greek Letters for each society's name, and not to Greek ethnicity.

Historical sketch

The University of Minnesota Greek system is over 145 years old, having grown steadily with the rapid growth of the university. Its first men's fraternity, Chi Psi, dates to 1874, and its first women's fraternity, Kappa Kappa Gamma, dates to 1880, long before the term 'sorority' was popularized as a term for the women's 'houses'.

Yet these pioneer chapters did not themselves mark the beginnings of a fraternal presence at the school. Many of Minnesota's early University presidents and department heads were fraternity men or women from 'back East,' having experienced undergraduate life in the flourishing literary societies and old-line fraternities that in turn were born out of America's earliest institutions of higher learning. These include William Watts Folwell, the university's first president, who was a member of Alpha Delta Phi at Hobart College, Cyrus Northrop, who was both an Alpha Sigma Phi AND a member of Delta Kappa Epsilon at Yale, Ada Comstock, Dean of Women, and a member of Delta Gamma at Minnesota, president George Vincent who was also a member of Delta Kappa Epsilon at Yale, and president James Morrill who was also an Alpha Sigma Phi, at Ohio State.

Still, because Minnesota's is one of the oldest fraternity systems in the nation, many of the university's Greek chapters are consequently among the oldest of their respective organizations, and often have single-letter or first-series chapter names or designations.  Similarly, the age, prestige, size and breadth of the University of Minnesota have resulted in its hosting many of the nation's honor and professional fraternities for most disciplines.  As early as 1925, the Minnesota Gopher yearbook reported the presence of 25 national academic fraternities, 18 national academic sororities, and 33 national professional chapters on campus. Most of these, undergrad or professional, are (or were) residential.

Over 90 years later, as of 2017, Minnesota hosts 37 academic fraternities, 23 academic sororities, 61 honors societies, 31 professional societies, and 4 service- or religious-focused chapters.

Impact on campus, and population

Since inception, these organizations have delivered an outsized influence and benefit to the campus: The first indicator of this impact is the fact of hundreds of pages devoted to the myriad of Greek Letter organizations profiled in each issue of the Minnesota Gopher Yearbook during its century-long publication run. These organizations have served as a primary hub of the student experience at the university for their entire existence, for active members, regular guests, and alumni.

The high watermark for Greek Life participation by percentage, indicated by review of senior photos and club membership, was in 1910 through 1920, when approximately 1/4 of undergraduates participated in one or more of the academic or professional societies. The peak number of residential chapters came at approximately 75 in 1930. While membership continued to expand into the 1930s, the membership percentage decreased as the Minnesota campus grew less residential. Through this period, interest in Greek chapter membership was not as strong among commuters, 'night class,' and non-traditional students. The Membership percentage of the overall undergraduate population reached a low point of 3% in the late 1960s. Later, an upturn resulted in a numeric peak that came during the early 1980s: In 1981 the Office of Fraternity and Sorority Life reported 3,100 net members, while 3,964 participated in 1984.  In a spike downturn coinciding with the economic recession of that era, participation hit a marked numeric low point in about 2005, but recovering to 1,795 active members in 2011 its population showed a marked increase. By mid-2014 participation included approximately 2,800 net undergraduate members, as reported in June of that year, reflecting about 8% of the undergraduate population and about 12% of 2013–14's incoming freshmen class. Noteworthy membership gains continue: by 2017, participation had increased to 3,400, or fully 11% of the campus undergraduate population, even prior to adding students in the professional chapters. A new high point was reached in Fall of 2019, with 3,576 participants, or 12% of the student population. Since 2019, due mainly to the COVID pandemic, membership has declined somewhat, with Fall 2022 participation including 2,530 students, or 7% of the undergraduate student population. This number does not include professional or graduate student involvement. Fifty-eight campus chapters were residential as of 2017.

Traditions
For over a century, Minnesota's Greek chapters provided the backbone of campus support for traditions such as Homecoming and Campus Carnival, which events, along with Greek Week, almost immediately sparked a procession of annual competitions between chapters for best decor, musical talent, cheer, theater and dance. Athletic teams, where Greeks were predominant among both varsity and club sports similarly were knit into the campus life of previous decades, offering the university twin fountains of school spirit.

Homecoming
The longest-running collegiate football "trophy game" rivalry in the United States is Minnesota's enduring series of battles against the University of Michigan, whose Little Brown Jug was first captured by Minnesota in 1903. Building from the excitement of that memorable game, Minnesota's Homecoming tradition, an opportunity for alumni to gather at their Alma Mater, began in 1914 with a game against Wisconsin and a Homecoming Dance. By 1919 Greeks had organized a parade to mark the day, with fraternities, sororities, academic departments, and dorms all vying for the best-decorated float. The Minnesota Gopher yearbook of 1922 remarks in a retrospective of the 1919 event that "all University buildings, as well as the fraternities and sororities, were decorated in Minnesota and Michigan colors." This tradition has persisted and grown over 100 years.

Sports
Varsity and Inter-fraternal sports were intertwined in the first half of the 20th century. Early campus sporting legends were often members of campus fraternities. The most notable example is Sigma Chi's Bronco Nagurski, a standout Football All-American in 1929 who played for Minnesota from 1927 to 1929. He was named to the College Football Hall of Fame in its inaugural year of 1951. Pledging during the Fall of 1927, Nagurski participated in the rowdy social scene, endless buffet dinners and the arduous pledge process that would later be outlined by his biographer, Jim Dent. His experience was similar to other members in an era where Hell week was a requirement regardless of social or athletic status. Ninety years later, Nagurski's jersey and photo are still enshrined at the fraternity house where he remains as revered today as he was during his collegiate career. Another example is Phi Sigma Kappa's Bert Baston, likewise a standout All-American in both the 1915 and 1916 seasons. Baston later served as the Varsity Gophers' Ends Coach from 1930 to 1941, and again from 1946 to 1950, and was named to the College Football Hall of Fame in 1954. Alpha Delta Phi's Bernie Bierman was Head Coach at Minnesota from 1932 to 1950, likewise with a 4-year break for WWII service. He and Baston powered their 1915 team to a national championship as undergrads. Later, as Head Coach, Bierman went on to win five national championships and election to the College Football Hall of Fame in 1955. Bud Grant, long-time coach of the Minnesota Vikings was a three-sport, nine-letter athlete at Minnesota and a member of Phi Delta Theta, later elected to the Pro Football Hall of Fame. Sigma Chi served up three other All-Americans: Herb Joesting, a full back, elected to the 'Hall in 1954, All-American in 1926–27 and a chapter contemporary of Nagurski; George Gibson, fellow namesake of the Gibson-Nagurski football complex, selected as an All-American in 1928; and Earl Martineau, selected as an All-American in 1922 and 1923. Thus a single chapter had four All-Americans (two Hall of Famers) within a seven-year span, close enough for the four to be photographed, dressed for practice (pictured). A sixth campus All-American was Phi Delta Theta's Dick Wildung, 1942 team captain, NFL first-round draftee to the Packers, and yet another inductee into the College Football Hall of Fame, elected in 1957. Several decades later, another chapter boasted three outstanding Hall of Fame athletes at the same time: Carl Eller, Vikings legend, was a U of MN standout from 1959 to 1962, Bobby Bell was twice elected All-American, playing from 1960 to 1962, and Sandy Stephens, playing from 1959 to 1961, was named an All-American quarterback. All three were members of Alpha Phi Alpha. In all, 14 of 19 Gopher players who have been named to the College Football Hall of Fame as of 2021 have been members of campus fraternities.

It was a point of pride for fraternities to feature those "big men on campus" in their recruitment materials, Letterman for their respective athletic teams.

Several sports were popularized through early fraternity support. Whereas football, basketball, and track were named early varsity sports with the more robust funding that name implies, others, like tennis, wrestling and gymnastics were tagged as "minor sports." Hockey fit into a middle ground. The sport was played throughout the region as a club sport in the 1900s and 1910s, with ad-hoc teams named to represent the university on outdoor rinks as early as 1903 and again in 1910. Rivals included the University of Chicago and the University of Wisconsin. Interest steadily grew, along with inklings of future conference play. By 1920 some twenty teams fielded by the fraternities vied in what Gopher editorials deemed the "fierce competition for the league championship." The stars of this fraternity league, including Phi Sigma Kappa's Merle DeForrest, Paul Swanson and Frank Pond, and Delta Tau Delta's Chester Bros were named to a team to represent the university. That year, DeForrest organized a petition drive that resulted in permanent funding by the Regents, awarding the hockey team its long-sought varsity status. Soon after, former captain, Frank Pond was named as Varsity Hockey's third Head Coach (1930–35). Today, the team's Rookie of the Year award is named after Pond.

The first-ever Crew Racing competition was organized on May 13, 1926, by another Phi Sigma Kappa athlete, Owen "Sox" Whiteside '29, who had won an international juniors championship in the Northwest International Regatta the year prior. It appeared obvious to Minnesota Daily and Gopher yearbook writers that proximity to a mild stretch of the Mississippi River made it natural that the university should have a premier Crew team. The first-ever rowing competition at Minnesota was held that year, pitting honors societies the Iron Wedge and the Grey Friars against each other with borrowed 4-man shells in an attempt to jump-start the sport. Several races followed over the next decade, but the downturn of the Great Depression cooled interest and funding, which only returned to its previous level after WWII with the establishment of a men's rowing club team in 1957, and a women's varsity team in 2000.

Athletes continued to wear fraternity letters well into the 1980s until risk-averse coaches began to limit such fraternity participation within the major sports. Greeks still may be found among non-revenue teams, as club sports participants and within intramurals.

Campus Carnival and Greek Week
Where Homecoming was the premier event for the Fall Quarter at the University of Minnesota, Greek Week or the more recent 'Machy Days has provided a focus for Greek competition during the Winter Quarter. Yet it was the venerable Campus Carnival which held sway during the early Spring for over seven decades running. "Carni" grew from a small penny carnival established in 1914 to a massive, blaring fundraiser that rivaled any other campus in dollars raised for children's charities. Gamma Phi Beta sorority was the first sponsor, challenging the other sororities to decorate small booths. Three years later the Women's Athletic Association (WAA) took the lead, presiding over an event in the Women's Gym that was billed as a sort of miniature Mardi Gras; a swimmers exhibition had the ladies smeared with phosphorus before diving into the pool, and in 1931 they debuted women's fencing as one of several athletic exhibitions. But it was the competitive 'hawking' of items for sale or challenge games from which evolved the ballyhoo dance lines and show ticket barkers of later years. From this event the WAA earned needed funds for women's sports equipment and operating expenses. Later, beginning in the 1940s, it was managed by professional fraternity Alpha Kappa Psi, and finally, by an independent board of governors. After WWII, outgrowing the Women's Gym, the event took place in the Fieldhouse.

The event continued to grow and evolve. By the 1960s, fraternity and sorority pairings would design a 50' x 150' three-story set built upon scaffolding and decorated with painted flats, upon which a 10-person pick-up band would play, surrounded by a "ballyhoo" of a dozen sorority dancers. The 3-day event earned extensive coverage in the newspapers of the time, all similarly describing the scene: With the blare of a horn marking the time, the bands would play all at once, to entertain a crowd gathered in front. After eight minutes another horn would blast, and the crowd would surge into the bowels of the set to gather on bleachers where they'd watch a 12-minute one-act play. Every half hour, the cycle would repeat. Fieldhouse entrance tickets, show admission fees and concession proceeds would all be donated to charity. In its later years, Carni would grow to generate in excess of $250,000 annually over the three-day bash. Carni finally ended in 1989, on concerns over rapidly increasing insurance rates and its impact on grades.

On a smaller scale, Greek Week offered an opportunity to showcase athletic prowess on the intramural fields while musical and dance talent was celebrated on the stage of Northrop Auditorium, again, by pairings of fraternities and sororities.  It was common through the late 1990s for a fraternity and sorority to pair for these events, Homecoming, Greek Week and Carni, and not to join with multiple houses as is the practice today. About the year 2000, Greek Week ended, but was replaced by an expansion of 'Machy Days, originally an event hosted by Sigma Chi fraternity, adjusted to offer much the same array of events.

The culture of competitive fundraising for charities and participating in hands-on charitable work continues as a deeply held tradition among all the Greek chapters, at Minnesota and nationally.  Most have their own national charitable focus, while chapters often participate in more local efforts within their community.

Building Fraternity Row

Minnesota's fraternities and sororities built up their housing prospects in three distinct phases, according to the 2003 Minneapolis Historical Commission Study. Before 1900, most early chapters served their membership with rented private homes. Between 1900 and 1917, rentals gave way to properties built for the chapters, resulting in several iconic examples of Beaux-Arts, Georgian and Classical styles. Finally, between 1921 and 1936, Minnesota's fraternity chapters engaged in that same popular building spree which was sweeping across other early private and land grant colleges and universities from New York to California. The result of this last phase was the often stately homes occupied by many Greek chapters today, upgrades from boarding house-style clapboard and stucco homes, to the many Fraternity Row mansions that are visible at Minnesota along University Avenue SE, on 4th and 5th Street SE, and the 10th Avenue "Sorority Row," all in Minneapolis. Similarly, the St. Paul campus is home to several stately chapter buildings, or chapterhouses, along Cleveland Avenue. It is a testament to the alumni of many of these chapters that their buildings survived, as so many were financed by the 1920s financial bubble, having endured weak membership eras during the Great Depression and then the twin turmoils of WWII and 1960s anti-establishment unrest. Past university yearbooks, now digitally available, often picture these buildings, some with addresses and photos or professionally crafted etchings. A final wave of chapter building, usually in the Modernist style, occurred during the period 1950 to 1973.

Greek societies also provide a visible link with the past. Residential Greek chapters have been cited as architectural gems, "projecting a positive image through architecture, and setting an architectural standard for more than a century." Important examples of period architecture include Tudor with half-timber, Georgian and Federal variants of the American Colonial style, Vienna secessionist, English Gothic, Elizabethan or Georgian, and more recently, International Modernist styles. While many of these buildings are significant, enough to warrant the City of Minneapolis declaring the area a Greek Letter Chapter House Historical District in 2003, a few examples should be noted:

 Phi Gamma Delta (FIJI) was one of the earliest-built Row mansions, exhibiting the Vienna secessionist style, an offshoot of the Arts and Crafts movement.
 Gamma Eta Gamma law fraternity is a smaller example of Richardsonian Revival, perhaps with Queen Anne elements.
 Theta Tau, an engineering fraternity, is an example of the International Modernist style.
 Chi Psi is an exceptional variant of an English Tudor country house, "built to convey masculine dignity and prestige."
 Phi Sigma Kappa is an Elizabethan-revival Tudor, noted as a "romantic-era masterpiece."
 Sigma Phi Epsilon, built by B.O. Cutter and restored by Phi Delta Theta fraternity, this "gingerbread" home is a showcase of the Carpenter Gothic revival style. 
 Phi Kappa Psi combines elements of Georgian and Greek revival styles.
 Kappa Kappa Gamma offers a "dramatic and striking" mix of the English Tudor style, influenced by the Arts and Crafts movement popular at the time of its construction."

These and many other Minnesota chapterhouses exhibit exceptional elements of their architectural styles. The owners, often the same entities that built these homes, have maintained them in spite of age, sometimes hard use, and the financial strain of student organizations that can ebb and flow in popularity. Addresses may be found in the footnotes for these chapters, where they are listed below. Most style descriptions courtesy of the referenced Architecture Minnesota article.

Constrained somewhat by busy University Avenue and 4th Street, expansion of Greek housing has been discussed at several points. The 2003 Zellie study, cited among the references, notes that there had been planned a "Fraternity Court" in the early 1920s. This stately road was to have been on the site where Williams Arena was later built, to host a number of new buildings between 19th Avenue and Oak Street. In the 1960s, an early phase plan for a fraternity housing area on the river flats below the Washington Avenue Bridge was discussed. This plan did not materialize beyond the discussion stage. More recently, Community Student Housing Inc. (CSHI), a consortium of several fraternities, has discussed building shared dormitory space and new house fronts on up to four blocks between University and 4th Street.

Loss of original or long-term Greek properties
Late 1950s construction of highway 35W resulted in condemnation of multiple fraternity homes bordering what was 9th Avenue SE, many of which were sororities or professional fraternities. In Stadium Village, several stately houses along Washington Avenue SE were lost to commercial development. More recently, restrictive zoning has both helped and harmed chapters, where economics of scale no longer allow viability without remodeling, expansion or additional parking. Some chapters celebrate their buildings' local (or national) historic zone status, which has slowed the pace of demolition, while others see this as a cost burden. Nevertheless, some chapter buildings have been lost to multi-unit development, or have been sold to non-Greek buyers.  A few examples of still-existing former Greek properties should be noted. Market forces may allow some of these to become available to Greek ownership again:

 Delta Delta Delta sorority built the structure at 316 10th Avenue SE in 1917, owning it until at least 2004. The building is now occupied by Luther House, a Christian service group affiliated with the Lutheran Church, Missouri Synod.
 Theta Chi fraternity built the structure at 315 16th Avenue SE in 1930, owning it until at least 2000, and which was later purchased by a private party. It was renovated as a coffee house and boarding house and is leased by Kappa Pi Alpha Christian fraternity.
 Psi Upsilon fraternity built the structure at 1721 University Avenue SE, owning it from 1908 to 1941. The Student Co-op was established during WWII and has been a resident in that property ever since.
 Tau Kappa Epsilon fraternity built the structure at 1901 University Avenue SE, owning it from 1925 to 1938. In 1982 it was purchased by the YMCA, who sold it to the university in 2000.
 Chi Omega sorority was a long-term owner of the structure at 315 Tenth Avenue SE, owning it from 1927 until at least 1989. Originally built by Zeta Psi fraternity, the structure is now owned by the Maranatha Church.
 Acacia Fraternity owned 1206 Fifth Street SE from 1915 until at least 1968. It had been occupied and then owned by the Heart of the Earth survival school, associated with the American Indian Movement, since 1980. In 2013 the building was purchased by a private developer for residential housing.
 Kappa Delta sorority owned 1025 6th Street SE for almost 50 years, a property now rented out for general student housing.
 Alpha Delta Pi sorority built 1000 5th Street SE in 1952, occupying it until their closure in 1987. The building was sold to the Unification Church (the "Moonies"). This property has reverted to Greek ownership in 2017, with the purchase by Kappa Sigma.
 Kappa Sigma fraternity lived at 1125 5th Street SE for over 75 years, moving in 2002. Their former building is now a daycare.
 Alpha Xi Delta sorority owned 1115 5th Street SE for almost 40 years. It later was occupied by Sigma Phi Epsilon fraternity and was sold to a private owner to become a Bed & breakfast. in 2019 it reverted to Greek control, under Alpha Epsilon Pi.

These are examples. Other significant properties along University Avenue, Fourth, Fifth, and Sixth Streets SE, and the adjacent avenues were once home to Greek chapters and are now in private hands. A search of this page lists addresses where chapters once existed.

Future housing prospects
The need to improve and expand Greek chapter housing is a priority for fraternities and sororities at Minnesota. A 2012 University task force report showed that one of the biggest challenges faced by the present Greek System is the occasionally degraded state of chapter buildings.  Owned privately by not-for-profit alumni associations, some of these show signs of deferred maintenance. Several recent remodeling and renovation programs have allowed significant improvement to some chapters, including recent full renovations by Chi Psi, Gamma Phi Beta, Kappa Alpha Theta, and Phi Sigma Kappa, along with completely rebuilt houses for Alpha Gamma Rho, Kappa Sig, and FarmHouse. Lack of housing for fraternity and sororities, a community that had grown to almost 15% of the student population in 2017 according to the OFSL, remains a hurdle that new groups must overcome. This dearth is only partially remedied by the opening of the new (2013) 17th Avenue Freshman Dorm.  This particular project has allowed two ground-level rental suites along University Avenue for chapters new to campus, intended to serve as a long-term incubator.

The Minneapolis City Council approved a number of zoning changes that relaxed restrictions on Greek ownership and renovation of properties near campus in action taken on April 28, 2017. Specific code changes include:
Increases the maximum height of chapter buildings from 2.5 stories to 4.
Removes the requirement that a house may not "serve" more than 32 people, due largely to the uncertainty of the definition of 'serve'.
Allows on-site services to be used by all members or guests.
Allows Greek chapters to acquire properties not previously used as Greek housing. 
Reduces minimum lot area from 10,000 square feet to 5,000 square feet.

For a more extensive review of Greek Row buildings, past and present, see the University of Minnesota Greek Letter Chapter House Designation Study, as prepared for the Minneapolis Heritage Preservation Commission in 2003.

Greek chapter oversight

Individual chapters are managed by elected officers. Incorporated alumni groups own the residential chapter buildings where they exist, serving in the role of the property manager. Additional local alumni oversight varies by chapter. National organizations provide organizational and operational guidance, extending to disciplinary action where warranted. In partnership with national organizations, university oversight of the Academic and Social chapters is managed on a day-to-day basis by the Office for Fraternity and Sorority Life, a unit of the Office for Student Affairs.

Professional and Honor societies are coordinated at a lower level of administrative involvement by the various academic departments within the university and its several colleges, and of these, some operate merely cooperatively, with no involvement from the university at all.

Since gaining its first chapter in 1874, Minnesota administrators have maintained an open, if not always supportive relationship with its chapters . An impulse to exert administrative management on these highly visible registered student organizations has at times been offset by the interest in limiting liability exposure where it could be claimed that the administration was responsible but did not do enough to prevent an unsafe or illegal occurrence. Minnesota's Greek System has, on balance, avoid the frequency of harmful events, as have occurred at other large schools; this primarily as the result of self-policing. The original, more active relationship between the Greeks and the Administration had been marginalized somewhat after the turbulent late 1960s and during the lassaiz-faire commuter-student years of 1970–90. This coincided with national scrutiny and bad publicity over hazing events elsewhere in the US. With the return to a more residential campus, both the Minnesota Greek System and its relationship with the university are thriving: An estimated 2,800 Greeks on campus participate in 58 separate undergraduate Academic and Social chapters. In addition, Professional and honor societies, many accepting undergraduates, number more than 80. Because of this and other factors, the university is again improving its relationship with the Greek Community:

In March 2012, President Kaler announced the formation of a Greek Community Strategic Task Force (GCSTF) and issued a Charge to the GCSTF Steering Committee which emphasized the need to develop a "sustainable and robust relationship between the University and the Greek community."

Criticism

Over the decades, Minnesota's Greek system, like others nationwide, has had its detractors.  Most notably in the late 1960s, anti-establishment agitation resulted in decreased interest and participation. This negative environment abated with the end of the Vietnam War. While membership again surged beginning in the late 1970s, the campus population was swelling even faster. While hitting numeric highs, Greeks at Minnesota thus never achieved the pre-Vietnam era participation level as a percentage of the campus.  For some, Greeks were "too exclusive." Commuting students may have had little occasion to socialize with them on the largely non-residential campus. Some students chafed at overt culture differences where Prep-era Greek men would wear blazers and ties to Monday meetings. Occasional surveys of detractors would declare a perception that membership was akin to buying friends. For others, it was simply a monetary concern, with a reluctance to include fraternity or sorority dues into a tight college budget. The hugely popular movie, "Animal House" also branded for a generation the image of a lethargic, disruptive and academically inferior "frat boy" on the national consciousness.

Response to criticism

Fixing problems
Greek organizations both nationally and locally sponsor many risk avoidance programs for the real benefits of student safety and well-being, as well as to avoid harmful bad publicity. Hence, these organizations have learned to address criticism quickly: Chapters and national bodies have adopted extensive changes to reduce incidents of hazing and other harmful behaviors. The recent announcement by Sigma Alpha Epsilon to ban "pledging" nationwide is only the latest of such announcements, of revised prospective member programs now adopted by many fraternities. While not limited to fraternities and sororities, harmful activities like underage drinking and hazing are often headlined as local news stories, with fraternity chapters as the most visible examples. In this area too, active and alumni Greek leaders have responded to such negative publicity and the resulting criticism with programs that seek to reduce alcohol abuse and eliminate underage or binge drinking, with risk management training, by self-policing their own chapters, and with more stringent procedures to discipline offenders. All sororities and some fraternity chapters have banned alcohol in their living facilities. National fraternities, through the NIC and sororities through their national and local governing boards require member training each year to combat hazing, underage drinking, sexual assault and other harmful behaviors. Hence, individual chapters are not alone in addressing these problems. Inter-chapter governing boards at Minnesota (listed below by chapter groupings) provide event monitoring services and local risk management training, culminating in the introduction in 2012 of Arkeo, which served as an inter-Greek cooperative monitoring program to help chapters avoid risk.

Response to perceptions

As to the financial cost of participation, fraternity leaders note that the vast majority of Greek students work their way through school. In fact, the Office of Fraternity and Sorority Life claims that the average cost burden for fraternity chapter membership adds 3% to a student budget, and may indeed be less costly on a net basis when factoring reduced summer rents and lower live-in costs versus dorms and private apartments. Finally, the Minnesota campus is markedly more residential than thirty years ago. Development of over a dozen large for-profit private dorms and many upgraded apartments has increased the average quality and quantity of near-campus housing and has increased their average expense. The result has been that fraternities and sororities, previously perceived as among the more expensive housing options now range from "in line with" or even lower than the average cost of dorms or apartments.

Addressing the claim of exclusivity in recruitment materials, Greek leaders will accept that label as another way of saying they promote high standards. All fraternities are by definition self-selective.  But, they clarify, so are all friendships. Further, they state, "U" students all have passed a bar of exclusivity by getting into the increasingly selective University itself. With an array of student groups numbering in the thousands, and a multitude of Greek chapter personalities, fraternity and sorority proponents are confident that all students who wish to join a Greek society can find one where they can flourish. The matter of religious and race exclusivity appears to have passed several generations ago: While some chapters are historically black, Hispanic, or Asian-oriented, there is no race exclusivity or other discrimination exclusivity in any of Minnesota's chapters. All are integrated and have been for some time. Minnesota was the second Big Ten school (after Wisconsin) to see its fraternities and sororities drop all bias clauses (race, color, or creed) from their bylaws and policies. Older chapters have been integrated since the 1950s and 1960s and the multi-cultural Greek chapters since their founding in more recent years.

Benefits to student and campus
Greek society participation was strongly correlated with a more positive student experience in a study conducted by the Student Organization Development Center in 1987. In 2017, the 60 current chapters of the Inter-fraternity Council, Pan-Hellenic Council, Multicultural Greek Council, and National Panhellenic Council provided 30,000 hours of volunteering in the surrounding community. The organizations also provide fundraising for various organizations in 2017 groups raised $200,000 for various causes.

 Community Standards Housing Inc. was incorporated by several chapters to improve Greek Housing. While CSHI's proposed Greek Village development for the 1700 block of University Avenue was not adopted in 2011, in March 2012, University President Kaler followed up on his promise at that time with the formation of a Greek Community Strategic Task Force (GCSTF), with the Charge to the group that "emphasized the need to develop a sustainable and robust relationship between the University and the Greek community." In the CHSI discussion he stated, "[The Greeks] get better grades, graduate sooner, and give more money to the University." Under his direction, the UM Foundation has been collecting data on Greek participation for all students, a data point that had been only sporadically kept prior to 2012.

Graduation rates and GPA
Greeks continue to graduate at a faster pace and with higher GPAs than the general university population.  According to 2022 figures, the All Fraternity-Sorority GPA rank for Spring 2022 was 3.38, while the All University rank was 3.32.  The Panhellenic (sorority) average was 3.47, significantly ahead of the All Women's rank of 3.39, and the IFC chapters were slightly ahead of the All Men's average. Greek affiliated students report higher rates of graduation within four years (79.2%) versus the UMN average of 73.3%, as reported in 2021, the most recent year released. These trends have been in place for several decades, and have been noted in earlier OFSL reports. One of the drivers has been ongoing chapter and governing body focus on "strong study habits and academic success", where Greek-affiliated students sign a Grade Authorization release that allows tracking of scholastic results throughout a collegian's career.

Academic and social fraternities and sororities
For brevity, the sections below make extensive use of Greek letters, one of the first items in a new member's instruction program. Most fraternities use two or three Greek letters to signify their symbolic or secret names; a few use non-Greek words. The main listing for each fraternity or sorority shows their full name at least once, with references and Wikilinks as available.

Fraternities constituting the Interfraternity Council (IFC)
Listed with dates of local founding and national conference membership, these are men's organizations at the University of Minnesota, voluntarily coordinating their efforts within the campus IFC. While most IFC chapters are based in Minneapolis, several call St. Paul their home. After a period of level membership, for various reasons, fraternity membership is increasing rapidly.  Average chapter size is 50, and several chapters exceed 100 men.

Fraternity buildings are generally owned by chapter alumni organizations.  Some chapters are non-residential, while a few rent or lease space.

As part of IFC or national organization self-governance, or University disciplinary action, chapters may be suspended ("de-recognized") or closed for a time. When a chapter is closed and/or forfeits its housing, it will be listed as a dormant chapter. See the Office for Fraternity and Sorority Life (OFSL) for current recognized IFC members.
(NIC) indicates members of the North American Interfraternity Conference.
(PFA) indicates members of the Professional Fraternity Association.
(FFC) indicates members of the Fraternity Forward Coalition.

Active academic and social fraternity chapters at Minnesota

  – Chi Psi, 1874 (NIC)[pic1]
  – Delta Tau Delta, 1883 (NIC)
  – Phi Kappa Psi, 1888 (NIC)[pic1]
  – Sigma Chi, 1888 (NIC)
  – Beta Theta Pi, 1889 (NIC)
  – Delta Kappa Epsilon, 1889 (NIC)
  – Phi Gamma Delta (FIJI), 1890 (NIC)
  – Alpha Delta Phi, 1892–1996, 2000 (NIC)
  – Delta Chi, 1892 (NIC)
  – Zeta Psi, 1899–1982, 1987–2007, 2016 (NIC)

  – Kappa Sigma, 1901[pic1]
  – Sigma Alpha Epsilon, 1902 (NIC)
  – Alpha Tau Omega, 1902 (NIC and FFC)
  – Sigma Nu, 1904 (NIC)
  – Phi Sigma Kappa, 1910 (NIC)[pic1]
  – Alpha Phi Alpha, 1912 (NPHC & NIC)
  – Sigma Alpha Mu, 1915 (NIC)
  – Alpha Sigma Phi Colony, 1916–35, 2013 (FFC)
  – Sigma Phi Epsilon, 1916–41, 1949–58, 1978[pic1]
  – Alpha Gamma Rho, 1917 (NIC & PFA)

  – Tau Kappa Epsilon, 1917–40, 1948–63, 1979–87, 2014[pic1]
  – Pi Kappa Alpha, 1922–36, 1986–2000, 2006 (NIC)
 Triangle, 1922 (NIC)
  – Theta Chi, 1924–2000, 2013 (FFC)[pic1]
 FH – FarmHouse, 1931 (NIC)
  – Alpha Epsilon Pi, 1949–73, 2004 (FFC)
  – Delta Sigma Phi, 1967–71, 1985–86, 2019–present (NIC)
  – Beta Chi Theta, 2006 (NAPA & NIC) South Asian interest
  – Sigma Pi, 2008 (NIC)

Chapters whose names changed

  – Theta Phi, 1879–91 (local), became 
 Thulanian, 1889–1924 (local), became 
 Hautbeaux Club, 1889–1890 (local), became 
  – Alpha Delta Epsilon, 1890–1892 (local), became 
 Addisonian Club, 1890–1892 (local), became 
 Varsity Club, 1893–97 (local), became  (see )
  – Kappa Phi Upsilon, 1897–99 (local), became 
  – Alpha Kappa Pi, 1900–1902 (local), became 
  – Alpha Tau Delta, 1901 (local), became 
 Acacia Club, 1903–06, became Acacia (fraternity)
  – Chi Rho Theta, 1907–16 (local), became 
 FLX Club, 1908–10 (local), became 
 Svithiod, 1911–21 (local), became  (see )
  – Phi Alpha Tau, 1911–1912 (local), became 
  – Alpha Kappa Sigma, 1911–1920 (local), became 
 Uta Oto, 1914–1917 (local), became 
  – Xi Psi Theta, 1914–23 (local), Jewish, became  (see )
 Omar Club, 1914–15 (local), became  (see )
  – Alpha Kappa Phi, 1915–16 (local), became 
  – Alpha Theta Psi, 1915–16 (local), became 
  – Eta Sigma Rho, 1916–1917 (local), became 

 Mandarin Club, 1919–1923 (local), became  (see )
  – Chi Delta Xi, 1921–28 (local), became 
  – Chi Sigma Tau, 1921–22 (local), became Triangle 
 Phi Club, 1921–23, Jewish, became  (see )
  – Alpha Chi Alpha, 1921–22 (local), became 
 Sphinx, 1922–25 (local), became 
  – Mu Delta Phi, 1923–1925 (local), became  (see )
  – Phi Epsilon Pi, 1923–70, Jewish, became 
  – Theta Kappa Nu, 1925–33, dormant (see )
  – Beta Sigma Epsilon, 1924–28 (local), Jewish, became 
  – Phi Beta Delta, 1925–33, Jewish, dormant (see )
  – Phi Kappa, 1947–59, became 

Dormant fraternity chapters
  – Phi Delta Theta, 1881–1889, 1891–1994, 2010–2021
  – Delta Upsilon, 1890–1986, 1991–2018 (NIC), dormant

  – Psi Upsilon, 1891–1993 (NIC), dormant[pic1]
  – Theta Delta Chi, 1892–1984 (NIC), dormant
  – Theta Nu Epsilon, 1893–1900?, −1934 (later NIC), dormant
 Acacia, 1904–1978, 1983–93 (NIC), dormant[pic1]
  – Phi Kappa Sigma, 1916–43, 2013–2020 (NIC), dormant
  – Theta Xi, 1920–65 (NIC), dormant
  – Chi Sigma Phi, 1924–28 (local), dormant
  – Lambda Chi Alpha, 1925–38, 1947–59 (NIC), dormant
  – Pi Lambda Phi, 1925–33 (NIC), Jewish, dormant<ref name="PiLam note">'s renamed Rho chapter is listed as dormant on the national website. Retrieved January 18, 2020. Installed XX, MONTH 1925 (same as Phi Beta Delta, predecessor). Phi Beta Delta should also not be confused with the honors society of the same name.</ref>
  – Tau Delta Phi, 1928–52 (NIC), Jewish, dormantFormer address in 19xx: 1710 4th Street SE, (on the north side of 4th, across from 17th Street Dorm). Address in 1929: 320 7th Street SE, Minneapolis, MN. Minnesota Gopher Yearbook, 1931, p.362, shows 's Phi chapter at 701 Washington Ave. SE, Minneapolis, MN. Address in 1940: 317 17th Avenue SE, Minneapolis, MN (across the alley from ΒΘΠ, now razed for Keeler Apts.). Address in 1943: 1313 6th Street SE, Minneapolis, MN. Non-residential in 1946. 
  – Chi Phi, 1928–43, 1946–94 (NIC), dormantThe Greek Community Strategic Task Force Report, 16 December 2012 , notes  as closing in 1994, but this doesn't match other sources, which cite 1990.
  – Phi Kappa Theta, 1947–61 (NIC), dormantMinnesota Gopher Yearbook 1959, p.280, notes pending merger of Phi Kappa and Theta Kappa Phi, to form Phi Kappa Theta. Installed . Lived in several rental properties. At the time of the merger, their address in 1959: 525 10th Avenue SE, Minneapolis, MN.
's beginning came as a group called its Delta colony (a Greek-letter named colony indicator only for the purpose of colonization) in 1947. Two years later this group was installed as the fraternity's Beta Iota chapter, pre-dating any national merger.
  – Beta Sigma Psi, 1963–83 (NIC), Lutheran Church, dormantAddress from 1965 to 1980+: 1103 5th Street SE, Minneapolis, MN. This was 's Kappa chapter.
  – Omega Nu Alpha, 2000–13 (local), dormant

Sororities constituting the Panhellenic council (PHC)
Listed with dates of local founding and national conference membership, these are women's organizations, voluntarily coordinating their efforts within the PHC. For convenience, the term "sorority" is used throughout, though some of these organizations are "women's Fraternities," and were so named prior to the popularization of the term, sorority. The terms are synonymous, After a period of level membership representing about 3% of campus women, for various reasons, sorority membership is increasing rapidly.  Chapter size in almost all cases now exceeds 120 women.

Interest and recruitment is strong enough that, in 2013, the University of Minnesota was opened to PHC expansion for the first time in 30 years, and the resulting two colonization efforts (welcoming Chi Omega and Phi Mu) occurred in 2013 and 2016, respectively.

Sorority properties are generally owned by a chapter's alumnae club, though some chapters do not have housing, and others rent or lease space. As part of PHC or national organization self-governance, or University disciplinary action, chapters may be suspended ("de-recognized") or closed for a time. If a chapter is closed and/or forfeits its housing, it will be listed as a dormant chapter. See the Office for Fraternity and Sorority Life (OFSL) for current PHC members and for expansion support.
(NPC) indicates members of the National Panhellenic Conference.Active academic and social sorority chapters  – Kappa Kappa Gamma, 1880 (NPC)'s Chi Chapter website. Retrieved November 21, 2018. Installed April 21, 1880. Address in 1908: 1413 University Ave. SE, Minneapolis, MN. Address in 1909: 1023 University Ave. SE, Minneapolis, MN. Address in 1910: 1728 4th Street SE, Minneapolis, MN. Address in 1914: 1728 4th Street SE, Minneapolis, MN. Address in 1915: 329 10th Avenue SE, Minneapolis, MN, which they built, through the present day.
  – Delta Gamma, 1882 (NPC)
  – Kappa Alpha Theta, 1889 (NPC)'s national website, showing Upsilon Chapter. Retrieved May 21, 2014. Installed Feb 6,, 1889. Address from 1914 to 1951: 314 10th Avenue SE, Minneapolis, MN (the right side of the former ΔΔΔ house). Address in 1951: 1012 5th Street SE, Minneapolis, MN, through the present day.
  – Alpha Phi, 1890 (NPC)
  – Pi Beta Phi, 1890–1897, 1905 (NPC)'s Minnesota Alpha chapter website. Retrieved May 22, 2014. The 7th ed. of Baird's notes a short dormancy until the chapter was re-established in 1905 with the absorption of a local sorority, likely formed for that purpose. Installed 1890. Re-installed . Address by 1914: 406 11th Avenue SE, Minneapolis, MN (Zellie). Address in 1915: 1212 5th Street SE, Minneapolis, MN. Address from 1916 to 1928: 1019 University Ave SE, Minneapolis, MN, which  built as the fifth sorority house on campus (Zellie, p. A-48). Address in 1928: 1109 5th Street SE, Minneapolis, MN, which it also built, through the present day. Zellie notes (p.A-78-79) that there was a previous wood framed, unnamed sorority house on this lot, dated from 1895. Pi Phi maintains an annex at 510 11th Avenue SE, Minneapolis, MN.
  – Gamma Phi Beta, 1902 (NPC)ΓΦΒ's Kappa Chapter website. Retrieved May 21, 2014. Installed May 23, 1902. Address until 1914: 1018 University Ave. SE, Minneapolis, MN. Address prior to 1915: 406 11th Avenue SE, Minneapolis, MN. Address from 1915: 311 10th Avenue SE, Minneapolis, MN, through the present day, making it the second chapter to construct a chapterhouse.  In 1967, ΓΦΒ bought and connected the neighboring building, formerly 921 University Ave SE, Minneapolis, MN, from Delta Upsilon fraternity, later expanding the connection between the buildings from a pass-way to a three-story expansion.
  – Alpha Gamma Delta, 1908 (NPC)'s Delta chapter website. Retrieved November 21, 2018. Installed Feb 14, 1908. Address in 1910: 611 13th Avenue SE, Minneapolis, MN. Address in 1914: 309 17th Avenue SE, Minneapolis, MN. Address in 1915: 1023 University Ave. SE, Minneapolis, MN. Address by 1965: 401 11th Avenue SE, Minneapolis, MN, which they built, through the present day. One reference (1965–66 Student Directory) noted this an address at 1029 4th Street SE., Minneapolis, MN, but this is merely the 4th Street side of the same property, probably the address of a former building on that site.
  – Alpha Omicron Pi, 1912 (NPC)'s Tau chapter website. Retrieved May 19, 2014. First address was: 1013 University Avenue SE, Minneapolis, MN (a single room in 1912). Address in 1915: 1213 15th Avenue SE, Minneapolis, MN. Address from potentially as early as 1916 until 1930: 914 4th Street SE, Minneapolis, MN (now Kappa's annex). Address in 1930: 1121 5th Street SE, Minneapolis, MN, which they built, through the present day.

  – Alpha Chi Omega, 1921 (NPC)'s Alpha Lambda chapter website. Retrieved May 19, 2014. Address by 1924: 1018 4th Street SE, Minneapolis, MN. Address by 1930: 514 11th Avenue SE, Minneapolis, MN. SE, Minneapolis, MN, through the present day.
  – Chi Omega, 1921–89, 2013 (NPC)[pic1]
  – Phi Mu, 1925–35, 1946–70, 2016 (NPC)
 Clovia (Beta of Clovia), 1939 4-H originClovia's website. Retrieved September 6, 2021. Address in 1959: 1502 Raymond Ave., St. Paul, MN. Address in 1989: 2067 Carter Ave., St. Paul, MN, with the purchase that year of ΓΟΒ's house.
  – Lambda Delta Phi, 1961 regionalΛΔΦ's Gamma Chapter website. Retrieved May 20, 2014. Address in 1965: 1276 No. Raymond Ave., St. Paul, MN. Address in 1979: 1381 N. Cleveland Ave., St. Paul, MN, where they reside today. This is the only remaining active chapter of the sorority.
  – Alpha Sigma Kappa, 1989, technical studies's Alpha chapter website. Retrieved November 10, 2017. Address in 1994: 1011 4th Street SE, Minneapolis, MN. Non-residential. Address in 2012: 126 Coffman Memorial Union, 300 Washington Ave. SE, Minneapolis, MN
  – Sigma Alpha Epsilon Pi, 2003–08, 2018, Jewish cultureThis national group had a presence on the campus in 2003 according to the referenced Minnesota Daily article, but ceased operations shortly thereafter. In 2017 a newly-formed local group, Kappa Lambda Epsilon chose to align with the national sorority thus restoring them to campus. Chapters of this national primarily participate within the Panhellenic Council on each campus, although a minority of chapters have opted to join their local Multicultural Council instead.Chapters whose names changed Secret Six, 1889–1890 (local), became 
 Khalailu Club, 1901–02 (local), became 
  – Beta Iota Gamma, ~1904–1906 (local), became Pi Beta Phi was re-established in 1905 by absorption of this local sorority, per a note in Baird's 7th ed. This was likely an early colonization, a planned effort with the aim of re-establishing Pi Beta Phi.
  – Lambda Beta, 1905–1907 (local), became 
  – Sigma Beta, 1910–18 (local), became 
  – Pi Theta Pi, 1910–12 (local), became Noted in the sorority's national magazine To Dragma, Spring 2013 issue, p.40. Retrieved May 8, 2020.
 Areme, 1915–1917 (local), became Achoth (see ) 
 Scroll and Key, 1916–28 (local), became  
 Achoth, 1917–22, Masonic-sponsored sorority, became ΦΩΠ (see )Address in 1920: 410 11th Avenue SE, Minneapolis, MN. None of the yearbooks provide this chapter's designation, which may have been the Yodh chapter or Teth chapter, prior to the name change to Phi Omega Pi (when it was re-designated as the Kappa chapter of its new sorority). Also, there is an error in the 1923 Minnesota Gopher yearbook, showing a chapter founding year of 1907. This should be 1917. The national sorority begun on Mar 15, 1910, at Nebraska.
  – Phi Omega Pi 1917–42, became Note, from 1917 to 1922 this Eastern Star-supported sorority was called Achoth. Address by 1926 through about 1942 (four years before the  merger): 800 University Ave SE, Minneapolis, MN
  – Delta Phi, 1920–1921 (local), became 
  – Delta Theta Epsilon, 1920–1921 (local), became 
  – Alpha Rho, 1920–24 (local), became There were two Alpha Rho organizations.  The first was the Alpha Rho Society, a short-lived local medical professional fraternity dating to 1897 or earlier, which that year petitioned to become a chapter of Alpha Kappa Kappa, a national medical fraternity. The second group was Alpha Rho, a local academic sorority formed in 1920 that became a chapter of Zeta Tau Alpha.
  – Alpha Lambda, 1920–1921 (local), became 
  – Sigma Kappa, 1921–61 (NPC), became  (local)
  – Zeta Alpha, 1923–27 (local), became  (see ) 
  – Beta Phi Alpha, 1927–40, dormant, (see )
  – Phi Delta Sigma, 1927–1930 (local), became  (see )
  – Alpha Delta Theta, 1930–34, became This academic and social sorority, ΑΔΘ, should not to be confused with the national professional sorority of the same name, chartered on the Minnesota campus some years later. 

  – Gamma Sigma Phi, 1936–1938 (local), became ΑΕΦ
  – Sigma Phi Eta, 1937–1939 (local), became Clovia
  – Nu Sigma Pi, 1959–1961 (local), became 
 Triangle Little Sisters, 1983–1989 (local), became 
  – Kappa Lambda Epsilon, 2016–2018 (local), Jewish, became Address in 2016: 1521 University Ave. SE., Minneapolis, MN, at the Hillel building. Dormant sorority chapters  – Delta Delta Delta, 1894–2004 (NPC), dormant[pic1]
  – Alpha Xi Delta, 1907–60, 1983–87 (NPC), dormantGCSTF12 notes  as closing in 1960, but other records note a re-colonization from 1983 to 1987.  Then, Zellie notes, almost certainly incorrectly, that  was in this last building until the late 1960s. Which is correct? The letter "Xi" in the sorority's name is pronounced in Greek fashion, as "Zee", and not anglicized as "Zye".[pic1]
  – Kappa Delta, 1918–72 (NPC), dormant[pic1]
  – Alpha Delta Pi, 1923–87 (NPC), dormant[pic1]
Phi Omega Pi national in turn was partly absorbed by Delta Zeta national in 1946, but this occurred about four years after the local  chapter at Minnesota had died. Note that the Zellie reference says  built 1100 4th Street SE in 1927. This conflicts slightly with Gopher photos and addresses, probably due to trailing publication timing.
  – Zeta Tau Alpha, 1924–59 (NPC), dormant
  – Gamma Omicron Beta, 1928–89 (local), St. Paul sorority, dormant
  – Beta Iota Alpha, 1928-19xx (local), dormant
  – Delta Phi Epsilon, 1929–32 (NPC), Jewish, dormant's Tau chapter at Minnesota is listed as inactive on their national website. Retrieved November 21, 2018
  – Sigma Delta Tau, 1929–94 (NPC), dormant
  – Alpha Epsilon Phi, 1938–78, 2009–17 (NPC), dormant's Alpha Iota chapter University of Minnesota portal. Retrieved November 21, 2018.
  – Beta Tau Lambda, 1961–64 (local, had been ΣΚ), dormant
  – Phi Beta Chi, 2011–19, Christian values, dormant

Multicultural (MGC) and national Panhellenic councils (NPHC)
Originally ethnic or language-affiliated, these organizations are now fully integrated – as are Minnesota's general Greek letter organizations.  Their historical affiliation may be reviewed by reading their local or national histories.  Some of the men's groups also participate in IFC events, and the women's groups in PHC events.

MGC and NPHC chapters are non-residential. The inter-Greek councils often cooperate on programs and policies, as do individual chapters from among the several Greek councils.

Listed with dates of local founding and national conference membership, these are either men's or women's organizations, voluntarily coordinating their efforts within the larger Multicultural Greek Council (MGC) and for some, in the National Pan-Hellenic Council (NPHC). See the Office for Fraternity and Sorority Life (OFSL) for current MGC and NPHC chapters.
(NALFO) indicates members of the National Association of Latino Fraternal Organizations;
(NAPA) indicates members of the National APIDA Panhellenic Association;
(NPHC) indicates members of the National Pan-Hellenic Council;
(NPC) indicates members of the National Panhellenic Conference.

Honor, professional, service and recognition societies
Honorific, professional and service organizations have a similarly long history of activity on the University of Minnesota campus. These are coordinated through academic departments, not the OFSL. They use similar naming conventions for chapter and national organizational hierarchy, and Greek Letters as identification. Some of these are populated by graduate students, a few exclusively so. As a rule, the honor and professional societies focus on specific academic, professional, or service missions. Historically too there has been significant crossover and cooperation between types; some professional societies have revised themselves into non-residential honor groups. In contrast, several professional organizations have gone the other direction to a conference among the academic and social chapters. But most remain oriented toward senior students (including 3rd and 4th year students) and graduate students. Social/academic fraternity or sorority membership is not a requirement for these groups. Individuals who meet a group's criteria may join or be "tapped," or asked to join, as may non-Greek students.  Multiple affiliations may be allowable as membership is frequently not exclusive to one group – see individual societies for details.  Activity varies; some of the professional and service groups are residential, while the honors societies may meet only quarterly or annually, if at all. The cut-off line where any campus organization falls within these headings or without is by long-established convention; those formed prior to 1990 are listed under the subheadings used by various volumes of the Baird's Manual of American College Fraternities, which for more than a century has been the data source of record for such organizations.  Newer groups have been placed in categories similar to Baird's. The latest version of Baird's, 1991, was published before the national development of some of the societies here, and therefore, position and inclusion is, in some cases, assumptive.

Honor and recognition societies
Honor societies recognize students who excel academically or as leaders among their peers, usually within a specific academic discipline. Because of the age, size and research focus of the University of Minnesota, it hosts a wide variety of these organizations. Members commonly include the society on their résumé/CV, which may serve to bolster grad school acceptance, publishing merit, and professional opportunities.

Listed by date of local founding with national conference membership, these are co-ed, non-residential, achievement-based organizations which self-select members based on published criteria.

At graduation, or at times of formal academic processionals, graduates, administrators, PhD holders, and post-doctoral fellows wear academic robes in the colors of their degree, school, and other distinction, according to a voluntary Intercollegiate Code that governs customs such as formal academic regalia. In addition, various colored devices such as stoles, scarfs, cords, tassels, and medallions are used to indicate membership in a student's honor society; cords and mortarboard tassels are most common. Phi Beta Kappa, the first honor society, locally founded at Minnesota in 1892, has used  Pink and  Sky blue since its national founding in 1776.  Hence, students tapped for  may wear tassels or other society-approved items, in these colors. Like most schools, the University of Minnesota allows such regalia for honor society members. Stoles are less common, but they are used by a few honor societies. In academic circles, colors are well-known, and follow long-standing protocols. The ACHS website lists the colors for their 68 member organizations, and the Honor society WP page lists others. 

Many honor societies invite students to become members based on scholastic rank (the top x% of a class) and/or grade point, either overall, or for classes taken within the discipline for which the honor society provides recognition. In cases where academic achievement would not be an appropriate criterion for membership, other standards are required for membership (such as completion of a particular ceremony or training program). These societies recognize past achievement. Pledging is not required, and new candidates may be immediately inducted into membership after meeting predetermined academic criteria and paying a one-time membership fee. Some require graduate enrollment.  Because of their purpose of recognition, most honor societies will have much higher academic achievement requirements for membership than professional societies. It is also common for a scholastic honor society to add a criterion relating to the character of the student. Some honor societies are invitation only while others allow unsolicited applications. Finally, membership in an honor society might be considered exclusive, i.e., a member of such an organization cannot join other honor societies representing the same field. Governance requires a faculty sponsor and each society remains faculty-guided, usually with alumni input.
(ACHS) indicates members of the Association of College Honor Societies.Active honor and recognition societies  – Phi Delta Phi, 1891, legal honors
  – Phi Beta Kappa, 1892, academic honorsThis is 's Minnesota Alpha chapter
  – Sigma Xi, 1896, graduate science and engineering honors
 Mortar Board, 1903–19 as local, 1919 (ACHS), scholarship, leadership and public service honorsAssociation of College Honor Societies website: search for current status of this society at the University of Minnesota. Retrieved May 18, 2014
 Iron Wedge, 1911-197x, 1985 (local), Greek interfraternalism, merit and leadership, Seniors, now secret
  – Alpha Omega Alpha, 1908, graduate medical honors
  – Phi Upsilon Omicron, 1909 (ACHS), family and consumer sciences honors
  – Tau Beta Pi, 1910 (ACHS), engineering honors's Minnesota Alpha chapter University of Minnesota portal. Retrieved September 11, 2016
  – Phi Lambda Upsilon, 1910 (ACHS), chemistry honorsThis is ΦΛΥ's Minnesota Zeta chapter
 Order of the Coif, 1915, law school graduates honors
The chapter had begun as a local, quickly amalgamating with similar groups from early agricultural schools at a meeting held in Minnesota. See also Honors Society of Agriculture
The chapter is listed as inactive in a May 2020 search of the ACHS website, but this may mean only a lack of an annual report. It was most recently 'reestablished' in 2012, and maintains a University website.
  – Pi Lambda Theta, 1917 (ACHS), women's education honors
  – Delta Phi Delta, 1919, art honorsThere are two organizations on the Minnesota campus named Delta Phi Delta. One is an art honorary, and the other was a professional law fraternity.
  – Eta Kappa Nu, 1920, IEEE affiliation, electrical engineering, computer engineering honors.'s Omicron chapter University of Minnesota portal. Retrieved November 21, 2018. 
  – Xi Sigma Pi, 1920, forestry honors Delta Chapter University of Minnesota portal . Retrieved May 20, 2014. Scattered clippings indicate this group may be called XSP on some campuses. The 1975 student directory lists Xi Sigma Pi's Delta chapter as a residential chapter, with an address at 110 Green Hall, U of MN, on the St. Paul Campus.  Obviously this is an academic building.
However, the 1929 yearbook calls it the Alpha of Minnesota chapter. The national organization was formed at Wisconsin, in 1913.
  – Pi Tau Sigma, 1922 (ACHS), mechanical engineering honors
 Block and Bridle, 1923, animal livestock honors
  – Sigma Gamma Epsilon, 1922, earth sciences honors
  – Chi Epsilon, 1923 (ACHS), civil engineering honors's Minnesota Alpha chapter University of Minnesota portal. Retrieved September 11, 2016. "Date approved" as a new student group March 7, 1923, according to the 1941 Student Organization directory.
The national organization was formed at California, in 1912. The Minnesota chapter was approved as a new student group April 12, 1923, according to the 1941 Student Organization directory.

 Phalanx, 1925 (earlier?)-1950+, military, cadets honors
 Plumb Bob, 1926 (local), technical studies honors
  – Epsilon Sigma Phi, 1927, extension student honors 
  – Omicron Kappa Upsilon, 1929, dentistry honors
  – Rho Chi, 1930 (ACHS), pharmacy honorsΡΧ's Mu Chapter University of Minnesota portal. Retrieved September 11, 2016
  – Sigma Epsilon Sigma, 1930, freshman women, scholarship honors
  – Pi Sigma Eta 1930, mortuary science honors
  – Beta Alpha Psi, 1931, accounting, finance and information systems honors / SAFA website. Retrieved June 8, 2014. Rho chapter at Minnesota was approved as a new student group May 12, 1931, according to the 1941 Student Organization directory.
  – Sigma Theta Tau, 1934 (ACHS), nursing honors's Zeta chapter website. Retrieved November 21, 2018
  – Omega Chi Epsilon, 1934 (ACHS), chemical engineering honors
  – Psi Chi, 1936 (ACHS), psychology honors's Minnesota chapter University of Minnesota portal. Retrieved September 11, 2016.
  – Phi Alpha Theta, 1937 (ACHS), history honors's national website shows the Phi chapter at Minnesota, and provides contact information.  There is no local portal website.
  – Kappa Tau Alpha, 1948 (ACHS), journalism, mass communication honors's national website shows the Minnesota chapter of the society, and directs inquiries to the School of Journalism and Mass Communications. Retrieved June 8, 2014
 AAS – Arnold Air Society, pre-1949, Air Force cadet honors
  – Pi Delta Phi, 1950 (ACHS), French honors's Alpha Xi chapter University of Minnesota portal. Retrieved September 11, 2016. 
  – Tau Beta Sigma, 1952 (NIMC), co-ed band honors's Alpha Iota chapter University of Minnesota portal. Retrieved September 11, 2016. Predecessor group was  local sorority. Retrieved June 5, 2014
  – Phi Zeta, 1952, graduate veterinary medicine honors may not have a national website. Many chapters (Purdue's, for example, here), show the Minnesota Kappa chapter of the society. Retrieved June 8, 2014. May require a faculty sponsor.
  – Sigma Gamma Tau, 1953 (ACHS), aerospace honors's national website notes that the most recent update from local Minnesota chapter sponsors came in in 1996. May need faculty sponsorship to revitalize. Retrieved June 8, 2014 
 Silver Wings, 1954, National defense oriented service organizationFounded as Angel Wings, to serve as the auxiliary to the Arnold Air Society, the group took the name Silver Wings after 1998, when campus units were given the option of using either name. Its restated purpose is "as a civilian organization that emphasizes leadership, citizenship, and development of professional skills," according to the Silver Wings website. Retrieved October 14, 2016. Minnesota's is the Nighthawk chapter.
  – Alpha Kappa Delta, 1956 (ACHS), sociology honors's national website lists the Minnesota chapter as dormant as of 2004. This means the sponsor retired, and it needs a new academic sponsor.
  – Pi Kappa Lambda, 1958 (ACHS), music honors's national website notes Minnesota's Alpha Sigma chapter went inactive in 2001; this likely means the faculty sponsor retired, and is easily remedied with a new sponsor.
  – Sigma Phi Alpha, 1958, dental hygiene honors
 Evans Scholars, 1958, (residential) golf caddies honors
  – Alpha Epsilon, 1960 (ACHS), agricultural, food, and biological engineering honors 

  – Pi Alpha Xi, 1968, horticulture honors"Recent chartering, (early 1968), noted in the Minnesota Nurseryman's Newsletter, July–August 1968. Retrieved September 23, 2016.
  – Rho Lambda, 1974, women's Greek leadership honors
  – Phi Kappa Phi, 1974, honors, all disciplines
  – Omicron Delta Epsilon, 1977 (ACHS), economics honors
 Order of Omega, 1979, Greek society leadership honorsOrder of Omega's University of Minnesota portal. Retrieved September 11, 2016.
  – Sigma Pi Sigma, 1979 (ACHS), physics honors
  – Sigma Lambda Alpha, 1979 (ACHS), landscape architecture honors's Minnesota chapter, University portal. Retrieved August 12, 2016.
  – Phi Tau Sigma, 1981, food science and technology honors 
 Golden Key, 1982, high achievement in academics, leadership & serviceGolden Key's University of Minnesota chapter University of Minnesota portal. Retrieved May 22, 2014
  – Delta Omega, 1985, public health honors
  – Alpha Epsilon Delta, 1993 (ACHS), pre-med honorsLocal ΑΕΔ website. Retrieved May 27, 2014
  – Phi Lambda Sigma, 1993, pharmacy leadership society
  – Kappa Kappa Psi, 1994 (NIMC), band and performance honors's Kappa Alpha Chapter website. Retrieved May 21, 2014. Historical sketch of ΤΒΣ and ΚΚΨ. Retrieved June 5, 2014
  – Eta Sigma Phi, 1995, classics honors
 Collegiate Scholars – Nat'l Society of Collegiate Scholars (NSCS), 1999 (ACHS), high achievementCollegiate Scholars University of Minnesota portal. Retrieved May 22, 2014
  – Pi Alpha Alpha, 2010, public administration honors
  – Tau Sigma, 2014, honoring transfer students for academic achievement and involvement's Epsilon Tau chapter, national portal. Retrieved August 12, 2016.
  – Sigma Alpha Lambda, 20xx, leadership and service honors
  – Sigma Lambda Chi, 2017, construction management honorsSee the Sigma Lambda Chi website. Retrieved March 26, 2018, which noted the chapter's induction date of November 1, 2018.
  – Phi Beta Delta, 1990?, international scholars honors
 National fraternity key societies – There are many of these, often provided to members of national academic and social fraternities and sororities. They provide a subtle way of noting fraternity membership on a résumé, and tying it to academic achievement.Chapters whose names changed Honors Society of Agriculture, 1915–17 (local), agriculture honorary, became 
 30 Club, 1916–17 (local), organization formed by women doing editorial work on the "Minnesota Gopher," the "Minnehaha" monthly humor magazine, and the "Minnesota Daily." Became  (see AWC).
  – Theta Sigma Phi, 1917–68+, women's journalism honors, became the AWC.The Association for Women in Communications is the successor organization to this honors sorority which changed its name in 1972. Retrieved May 9, 2020.
  – Gamma Epsilon Pi, 1921–33, women's, commerce honorary, dormant, see 
  – Phi Sigma Phi, 1921–70+ (local), music and University Band honors, became the BSO (see  & )
  – Pi Delta Epsilon, 1922-1929+, men's journalism honorary, dormant, (see the Society for Collegiate Journalists)
  – Omicron Nu, 1923–1980+, home economics, became This was the Rho chapter of Omicron Nu.
  – Theta Nu, 1944–52 (local), women's band honorary, became  
  – Tau Omega, 1943–53, aerospace engineering honors, became 
 Angel Flight, 1954, auxiliary to Arnold Air Society, became Silver WingsDormant honor and recognition societies  – Delta Sigma Society, 1889–1895?, literary and debate society, dormant
  – Pi Beta Nu, 1888–93+ (local), senior honors, limited to five per class, dormant
  – Kappa Beta Phi, 1893–1935?, satiric, later financial honors, dormantNoted in the 1894 Minnesota Gopher yearbook.
 Scabbard and Blade, 1906–80+ (ACHS), military honors, dormant?Minnesota Gopher Yearbook, 1931, p.326 shows "B" Company, 1st Regiment (~chapter)
 - – Delta Sigma Rho-Tau Kappa Alpha, 1906-1980+, 2012?–2014? forensics honor, dormant
  – Lambda Alpha Psi, 1908–52+ (local), languages honors, dormant
  – Mu Phi Delta, 1908–15+ (local), men's and women's music honors, dormant
 Grey Friars, 1909–70+, (local) Senior men, of honors and service to the University, dormant
 Association for Women in Communications, 1911–59+, women's journalism honors, dormant
  – Phi Alpha Tau, 1911–~1915, national public speakers and actors honors, dormant
  – Sigma Delta Psi, 1912-1970+, national athletics recognition society, dormant ?The Minnesota chapter was the Beta chapter
 Wing and Bow, pre-1913-1934+ (local?), inter-fraternal agricultural honorary, dormant
  – Kappa Rho, 1914–34+ (local), women's forensics honors(?), dormant
 Skin and Bones, 1915–31+ (local), woman's inter-sorority honors, juniors, dormant
 White Dragon, 1916–68+ (local), Juniors, inter-fraternity honors (originally ΧΨ, ΦΚΨ, ΨΥ, ΔΚΕ, ΑΔΦ, later included others), dormant
  – Zeta Kappa Psi, 1917-19xx, women's forensics honors, dormant

  – Delta Phi Lambda, 1917–51+ (local), women's, later co-ed creative writing honors, dormant
 Incus, 1917–34+ (local), medical honorary, dormant
 Silver Spur, 1918-1959+, leadership honors, dormant
  – Tau Upsilon Kappa, 1919–31+ (local), men's inter-fraternity honors, dormant
 Mortar and Ball, 1920–48+, advanced military cadets honorary, dormant
  – Omega Eta Mu, pre-1920-19xx (local), dentistry honorary, dormant
  – Pi Alpha, 1921-1929+, men's art honorary, dormant
  National Collegiate Players or Pi Epsilon Delta, 1922–1970+, theater honors, dormantThe National Collegiate Players has been disbanded nationally. The 1925 Minnesota Gopher yearbook explains on p.262 that  organized in 1922, and affiliated with the National Collegiate Players just one year later, in 1923.
  – Alpha Pi Omega, 1922-19xx (local), School of Mines honorary, dormant
  – Delta Sigma Psi, 1922–1924+ (local), scholarship and investigation in Norwegian literature, dormant
 Torch and Distaff, 1922–1931+ (local), home economics honors, dormant
 Order of the Hub, 1922-23+ (local), interfraternity honors, dormant
Minnesota's  Rho chapter was founded in 1923 and existed to 1980 or later, hence  is listed here, using 's dates of confirmed activity. The website for the successor group, lists this chapter as dormant. Needs faculty sponsor to reactivate.
  – Alpha Delta Sigma (AAF), 1923–1973, advertising honors, dormant
  Pi Tau Pi Sigma, 1925-1942+ military, signal corps honors, dormant
  – Alpha Sigma Pi, 1926–1964 (local), senior men's education honors, dormant
  – Eta Sigma Upsilon, 1927–1964 (local), senior women's education honors, dormant
 Phoenix, 1930–59+ (local), junior men's service and recognition, dormant
 Orbs, 1935-66+ (local), women's medical technology honors, dormant
 Commacini Club, 1936–43 (local), architecture honorary, dormant
  – Beta Phi Beta, pre-1943-52+ (local), General College honorary, dormant
  – Omega Rho, pre-1946-50+ (local), Ceramic Arts honorary, dormant
  – Sigma Gamma Tau, 1943–96, aerospace engineering honors, dormant national website states that reactivation of Sigma Gamma Tau requires a faculty sponsor. Retrieved May 9, 2020
 Chimes, 1948–70, junior women's honors, dormant
  – Alpha Mu, pre-1951-1955+, grain engineering, dormant
  – Omicron Delta Kappa, 1976–2010, leadership and academic honors, dormant
  – Gamma Theta Upsilon, 1990–2006 (ACHS), geography honors, dormant national website chapter list. Retrieved June 20, 2016, notes their Eta Rho chapter at Minnesota being founded on April 25, 1990, with its last initiation on April 22, 2005, for an assumed dormancy date in 2006.
  – Omicron Sigma Sigma or Order of the Sword & Shield, 2011?–2017?, homeland security, intel, emergency mgmt & protective security honors, dormant 

Professional societies
Professional societies work to build friendship bonds among members, cultivate strengths whereby members may promote their profession, and provide mutual assistance in their shared areas of professional study.

Listed by date of local founding with national conference membership (if any), these are primarily co-ed organizations, showing an array of professional interests.  Some are residential in a co-operative fashion and all offer a moderate amount of social programming. Membership in a professional fraternity may be gained by the result of a pledge process, much like a social fraternity, and members are expected to remain loyal and active in the organization for life. Within their professional field of study, membership is exclusive; for example, if one joins a law society they cannot join another law society. However, these societies do initiate members who belong to social or honors fraternities. Professional Societies are known for networking and post-collegiate involvement, and membership is often included with pride on a résumé/CV. Governance varies from faculty-managed to purely student run.

(PFA) indicates members of the Professional Fraternity Association.Active professional societies  – Nu Sigma Nu, 1891, medical (residential)
  – Delta Sigma Delta, 1892, dentistry, medicine pharmacy (residential)A Sept 14, 2021 article in the Twin Cities Business Journal notes that the Alpha Chi Sigma building was being sold to Delta Sigma Delta. Accessed 14 May 2022.
  – Psi Omega, 1896–1903, 1918, dentistry (residential)
  – Phi Rho Sigma, 1904 (PFA), medical (residential)
  – Alpha Chi Sigma, 1904 (PFA), chemistry (residential) Beta chapter website. Retrieved May 19, 2014. Address in 1914: 410 Harvard Street, Minneapolis, MN. Address in 1924 until at least 1975: 613 Oak Street SE, Minneapolis, MN. Address in 2014: 632 Ontario St. SE, Minneapolis, MN. Address in 2022: 802 Washington Ave SE., Suite 200, Minneapolis, MN.
  – Phi Delta Chi, 1904 (PFA), co-ed pharmaceutical (residential)
  – Theta Tau, 1904 (PFA), engineering (residential) Alpha chapter website. Retrieved May 19, 2014. Installed Oct 15, 1904. Address by 1914: 321 14th Avenue SE, Minneapolis, MN. Address in 1925: 1320 7th Street SE, Minneapolis, MN. Address by 1926: 406 11th Ave SE, Minneapolis, MN. Address by 1929: 629 Washington Ave. SE, Minneapolis, MN. Address by 1940: 324 Walnut St., Minneapolis, MN. In 1957 ΘΤ built 515 10th Ave SE, Minneapolis, MN, where they reside through the present day.[pic1]
  – Delta Theta Phi, 1905 (PFA), law
 Forestry Club, 1908, forestry
  – Phi Delta Kappa, 1910, education 
  – Alpha Rho Chi, 1916–91, 2014 (PFA), architecture Recolonization in the news . Retrieved June 16, 2014

 Society of Professional Journalists, 1916, journalismMinnesota Gopher Yearbook, 1927, p.453, shows Minnesota chapter. In 1988, Sigma Delta Chi changed its name to the Society of Professional Journalists, according to a historical brief, from the website of DePauw University where it was founded. Retrieved March 1, 2016. The University of Minnesota chapter's website. Retrieved March 1, 2016.
  – Kappa Epsilon, 1920 (PFA), pharmaceuticalKappa Epsilon was founded as a women's pharmacy fraternity, but is now coeducational. The Minnesota Gopher yearbook of 1926, p.525 notes its founding in 1917: Perhaps a predecessor organization? The group's constitution notes a 1921 ratification.
  – Phi Chi, 1920–1974, 1981, medical (residential)The University of Minnesota Medical School website lists 's Kappa Chi chapter on its website. Retrieved November 21, 2018. This chapter, formed independently by Phi Chi, later would absorb alumni from a dormant predecessor group that merged nationally into Phi Chi in 1948. This had been the Delta chapter of Phi Alpha Gamma fraternity, active at Minnesota between 1897 and 1909. That chapter closed with the demise of the School of Homeopathy. The merger allowed all remaining  alumni to take their place as alumni of Minnesota's then-established Phi Chi chapter. Address by 1925: 603 SE Delaware, Minneapolis, MN. In 1931, built 325 Harvard Street SE, Minneapolis, MN, through present day.
  – Alpha Kappa Psi, 1921 (PFA), business (residential)'s Alpha Eta Chapter website. Retrieved May 23, 2020. The chapter had been known for organizing the Campus Carni festival for decades. Address by 1914: 1214 4th Street SE, Minneapolis, MN. No address listed in 1925. Address by 1928: 1801 University Ave. SE, Minneapolis, MN. Address prior to 1930: 406 14th Avenue SE, Minneapolis, MN. Address in 1930: 916 6th Street SE, Minneapolis, MN. Address by 1940: 1116 5th Street SE, Minneapolis, MN, through present day.
  – Kappa Psi, 1922 (PFA), pharmaceutical
  – Phi Alpha Delta, 1922 (PFA), pre-law
  – Kappa Eta Kappa, 1923 (PFA), co-ed electrical engineering, computer engineering or computer science (residential)'s Beta chapter website. Retrieved May 20, 2014. Address by 1925: 1807 4th Street SE, Minneapolis, MN (razed, and later the site of Ridder Arena and the Baseline Tennis Center). Address in 1928: 531 Walnut Street SE, Minneapolis, MN. Address in 1959: 901 Washington Ave. SE, Minneapolis, MN. Address in 1968: 1100 4th Street SE, Minneapolis, MN, through the present day. Note, this property's postal address was shifted, where it had formerly been listed as 330 11th Ave. SE, Minneapolis, MN.
  – Phi Delta Epsilon, 1923 (PFA), Medical.'s building was sold, and the proceeds for some time continued to fund scholarships for medical students. . Retrieved May 23, 2014. The Make a Gift website for Minnesota's general endowment campaign, "Driven" states that it is no longer accepting donations for the Phi Delta Epsilon Jewish Medical Fraternity Fund. Retrieved November 21, 2018.  This was originally a Jewish medical fraternity, but in the late 1960s opened membership to women, and to persons of any faith background. Address by 1945: 312 Harvard St., Minneapolis, MN. Address in 1959: 501 Ontario St. SE, Minneapolis, MN (now razed).
  – Delta Sigma Pi, 1924 (PFA), business's Alpha Epsilon chapter website. Retrieved November 21, 2018
  – Gamma Eta Gamma, 1924, law (residential)'s Minnesota chapter University of Minnesota portal. Retrieved September 11, 2016. This is possibly the group's only remaining chapter.[pic1]

  – Sigma Alpha Iota, 1926 (PFA), women's, music
 Pershing Rifles, 1930 (PFA), military cadets
  – Sigma Delta Epsilon or GWIS, 1945, graduate women in science
  – Delta Pi Epsilon, 1951, business education, now part of National Business Education Association (NBEA).
  – Alpha Psi, 1956, veterinary medicine, (residential)ΑΨ's Nu Chapter website. Retrieved May 20, 2014. Address in 1959: 2111 Gordon, St. Paul, MN. Address in 1965: 2095 Scudder Ave., St. Paul, MN. Address by 1975: 2077 Commonwealth Ave., St. Paul, MN.
  – Kappa Alpha Mu, 1957, photojournalism, dormant?
  – Delta Theta Sigma, 1958, agriculture (residential)Address by 1959: 1862 Eustis, St. Paul, MN. Address by 1965: 1485 No. Cleveland Ave., St. Paul, MN.
  – Pi Sigma Epsilon, 1962 (PFA), sales and marketing
  – Alpha Tau Alpha, 1963, agricultural education
  – Phi Sigma Pi, 2011 (PFA), leadership and scholarshipChapters whose names changed  – Alpha Rho Society, 1892–1898 (local), men's medical, became .
  – Pi Kappa Tau, 1896–97, medical (homeopathy), became  (see ).
  – Phi Alpha Gamma, 1897–1909, medical (homeopathy), became .
  – Phi Delta, 1904–1918, medicine, became  (see ).
 Society of Hammer and Tongs, 1904–1911, engineering, became 
  – Phi Chi, 1904–1909, pharmacy, see .
  – Delta Phi Delta, 1905–1913, law, see .
  – Sigma Kappa Alpha, 1908 (local), mining, see .
This chapter dates itself to its operation for a decade as a chapter of the former Phi Delta fraternity. The unnamed chapter merged, along with its national into Kappa Psi fraternity in 1918. For eight more years this national allowed both medical and pharmacy students under its old name of Kappa Psi, but that fraternity then split in 1924. Minnesota's Kappa Psi pharmacy fraternity chapter AND Theta Kappa Psi chapter were the result. Nationally, Theta Kappa Psi took with it its 35 medical chapters including this chapter, the Kappa Phi chapter of Theta Kappa Psi.
  – Omega Upsilon Phi, 1908–34, medicine, see .'s Sigma chapter is noted in the Minnesota Gopher Yearbook, 1911, as forming in 1908, p.416. Its first years were on the Hamline University campus, but in ~1912 it moved its charter to the U of MN. The chapterThe national fraternity merged with Phi Beta Pi in 1934, which had its Xi chapter at Minnesota since 1904.
  – Alpha Kappa Phi, 1909–1913, law, see .
  – Tau Beta Phi, 1920-1922 (local), Jewish, men's dentistry, became .
  – Sigma Delta Chi, 1916–88, journalism, became the Society of Professional JournalistsMinnesota Gopher Yearbook, 1927, p.453, shows the Minnesota chapter. In 1988,  changed its name to the Society of Professional Journalists, according to a historical brief, from the website of DePauw University where it was founded. Retrieved March 1, 2016.
  – Delta Phi, 1920–22 (local), women's architecture, see .
 Mitchell Club, 1922–23 (local), men's law, became .
  – Alpha Alpha Gamma, 1922–59+, women's architectural, see AWA+D.<ref>[https://www.awaplusd.org/our-history AWA+Ds website]. Retrieved May 8, 2022. Minnesota was the Beta chapter of  but looks to have ceased operations in 1959, five years prior to the reorganization of the national in 1964 as the Association for Women in Architecture and Design.</ref>
  – Phi Delta Gamma, 1924–35, men's forensics, became .Minnesota Gopher Yearbook, 1931, p.304 shows the Minnesota Alpha chapter of 
  – Alpha Delta Tau, 1926–1944 (local), women's medical, see .
  – Iota Rho Chi, 1956-80+ (local), post-graduate Human Resources, see GSHRL or Graduate Society of Human Resources Leaders. Dormant professional societies
  – Pi Sigma, 1894–1910?, (local), engineering, dormant 
  – Alpha Kappa Kappa, 1898–1980+, medicine, national disbanded 
  – Theta Epsilon, 1900-1928+ (local), women's literary, dormant

  – Alpha Epsilon Iota, 1901–82, women's medical, dormant
  – Phi Beta Pi, 1904–70+, medicine, dormant
  – Alpha Zeta, 1905–73, agricultural, dormant
  – Xi Psi Phi, 1905–99, dentistry, dormant
  – Sigma Rho, 1910-1943+, mining, dormant
  – Alpha Kappa Sigma, 1911-1921+ (local), men's engineering, dormant
 - Zeta Kappa, 1914-19xx (local), men's dental, dormant
 CYMA, 1915-19xx, men's architecture, dormant
  – Gamma Alpha, 1915-1952+, interdisciplinary graduate students, dormant
 Cabletow, 1916-1924+, Masonic dental, dormant
  – Upsilon Alpha, 1918-1925+, graduate women's dental, dormant
  – Sigma Beta Gamma, 1920-25+ (local), women's business, dormant
  – Sigma Alpha Sigma, 1920–87? (local), Jewish, engineering, dormant
  – Beta Delta Phi, 1921-19xx (local), Jewish, men's dentistry, dormant
  – Pi Delta Nu, 1922–56, women's chemistry, dormant
  – Alpha Gamma Gamma, 1922-19xx (local), women's, dental nurses, dormant
  – Alpha Kappa Gamma, 1922–68+, women's, dental nurses, dormant
  – Alpha Omega, 1922-1968+ (PFA), Jewish, dentistry, dormant
  – Alpha Kappa Epsilon, 1923-19xx (local), women's, chemistry, dormant
  – Kappa Beta Pi, 1923–1958, women's law, dormant
  – Alpha Beta Phi, 1923–1958 (local?), Jewish, men's pharmacy, dormant
  – Alpha Delta Zeta, 1923-19xx (local), men's agricultural, dormant
  Sinfonia – Phi Mu Alpha Sinfonia, 1924–75 (NIMC), music focus, dormant
  – Phi Beta Gamma, 1925, law, dormant?

 Scarab, 1926-19xx, architecture, dormant
  – Tau Phi Delta (Treehouse), 1926–40+, forestry, dormant
  – Zeta Alpha Psi, before 1928-19xx (local), women's forensic, dormant
 Trowel, 1926-1929+, men's dentistry, dormant
  – Alpha Tau Delta, 1927–80+ (PFA), nursing, dormant
  – Mu Phi Epsilon, 1927–45 (PFA), music, dormant
  – Phi Beta, 1929-1980+ (PFA), creative and performing arts, dormant
  – Phi Epsilon Kappa, 1930–68+, physical education, health, sports management, dormant
  – Zeta Phi Eta, 1933–69 (PFA), communication arts and sciences, dormant
  – Mu Beta Chi, 1933–67 Jewish, men's business, dormant
  – Lambda Epsilon Xi, pre-1938-52+, Jewish men's law, dormant
  – Phi Delta (local?), 1938–80+, women's business, dormant
 Anchor & Chain, 1940–80+ (local), men's Naval ROTC midshipmen, dormant?
  – Alpha Epsilon Rho, 1943-1970+, electronic media and broadcast, dormant?
  – Sigma Pi Omega, 1940-1957+ (local), Jewish women's interprofessional, dormant
  – Alpha Delta Theta, 1944–75+, women's, medical technician and general sciences, dormant?
  – Phi Chi Eta, pre-1951-1955+ (local?), ROTC Quartermaster honors, dormant
  – Alpha Mu Sigma, 1952–75+ (local), men's applied mortuary science, dormant
  – Mu Iota Epsilon, before 1955-79+ (local), post-grad Industrial Education, dormant? 
  – Sigma Alpha Eta, 1957–68+, co-ed speech and hearing pathologies, dormant 
  – Alpha Alpha Theta, pre-1959-19xx?, women's medical terminology, dormant

Service societies

Listed with dates of local founding and national conference membership, if any, these are/were non-residential organizations designed to provide campus and community service. These organizations are self-governed.

Religious-themed fraternities and sororities
Primarily active during the 1940s and 1950s, these groups were formed in response to student interest in Greek life for those who required a closer association with peers of the same faith tradition.  Some were local organizations, some national. Some were residential, and all were co-ed unless noted. Note that some religious-themed and residential fraternities and sororities are listed under the Academic and Social groups by their choice. Many other religious-oriented groups on campus are NOT designed to resemble fraternities, and are not listed here. Groups are listed by date of local founding.

Other student organizations
The 2019–20 University of Minnesota Student Group search page included over 1,100 unique organizations. Major groupings include Greek-affiliation societies as listed on this page, which are further subdivided into academic/social, honors, professional societies, service groups, or recognition groups.

References
For active groups, stable chapter website links have been referenced when available. Alternatively, either a national website or the group's University of Minnesota portal has been noted, which, in turn, may provide contact information and/or a link to a current organization website as reported annually at the time of the group's registration. Student groups are required to register each year, making the University of Minnesota portal page a convenient place to find up-to-date contact information.

Where an address is noted these are from (A) Minnesota Gopher yearbooks dated 1888–1967, (B) chapter websites, (C) national organization websites, (D) The Conservancy website, showing annual Student Organization Directories, or (E) the Zellie Fraternity Row study for the City of Minneapolis Historical Preservation Commission, cited below.

External links
Links to informational pages (IFC, Panhel, etc.) about all of the fraternities & sororities at Minnesota
Office for Fraternities and Sororities Life at the University of Minnesota
University of Minnesota – Twin Cities
Minnesota Gopher Yearbook Archive
University of Minnesota Conservancy – an archive
List of Famous Minnesota Greeks

Minnesota
University of Minnesota